The Mountain View Solar Energy Project is a 20 MW solar photovoltaic power plant located in the Mountain View Industrial Park near North Las Vegas in Clark County, Nevada.  All power generated by the nearly 84,000 modules is sold to NV Energy via a power purchase agreement.  The plant is operated by Mountain View Solar, a subsidiary of NextEra Energy Resources

See also 

 Solar power in Nevada
 List of power stations in Nevada

References

External links 
 NextEra Energy Resources Fact Sheet: Mountain View Solar Energy Center
 NV Energy Renewable Energy 2015

Solar power in the Mojave Desert
Photovoltaic power stations in the United States
Buildings and structures in Clark County, Nevada
Solar power stations in Nevada
NextEra Energy